This is an incomplete list of ghost towns in New Hampshire:

 Beebe River
 Carrigain
 East Weare
 Gosport
 Johnson
 Kilkenny
 Little Canada
 Livermore
 Monson
 Old Hill VIllage
 True Francestown
 Zealand

See also
Defunct placenames of New Hampshire
New Milford, New Hampshire, a fictional ghost town, created as a hoax
 New Hampshire historical markers:
No. 143: East Weare Village
No. 185: Willowdale Settlement
No. 198: Alderbrook
No. 200: Wildwood
No. 233: Zealand and James Everell Henry

References

 
New Hampshire
Ghost towns